The 2014–15 Fairleigh Dickinson Knights men's basketball team represented Fairleigh Dickinson University during the 2014–15 NCAA Division I men's basketball season. The team was led by second year head coach Greg Herenda. The Knights played their home games at the Rothman Center and were members of the Northeast Conference. They finished the season 8–21, 3–15 in NEC play to finish in a tie for ninth place. They failed to qualify for the NEC Tournament.

Roster

Schedule

|-
!colspan=9 style="background:#800020; color:#FFFFFF;"| Regular season

References

Fairleigh Dickinson Knights men's basketball seasons
Fairleigh Dickinson